Freebase may refer to:

Free base or freebase, the pure basic form of an amine, as opposed to its salt form
Freebase (database), a former online database service
Freebase (mixtape), 2014 mixtape by 2 Chainz
An original song by the Mike Flowers Pops on their 1996 LP "A Groovy Place"

See also
 Freebass, a musical supergroup
 Free-bass accordion, a bellows instrument